Novadnieks is a regional newspaper published in Latvia.

Newspapers published in Latvia